Axel Jüptner (26 April 1969 – 24 April 1998) was a German professional footballer who played as a midfielder.

Jüptner played in the Bundesliga for VfB Stuttgart between 1988 and 1991. In 1991, he joined KFC Uerdingen 05 and helped win promotion to the Bundesliga the same year. He played for Uerdingen until November 1997, when he transferred to Carl Zeiss Jena. On 23 April 1998, during a training session in Jena, he suffered from myocardial infarction and died one day later.

References

External links
 

1969 births
1998 deaths
German footballers
Footballers from Baden-Württemberg
Association football midfielders
Bundesliga players
2. Bundesliga players
VfB Stuttgart players
VfB Stuttgart II players
KFC Uerdingen 05 players
FC Carl Zeiss Jena players